HS Vpered was a Russian hospital ship that was torpedoed by the Imperial German Navy submarine SM U-38 on 8 July 1916.

Construction 
SS Vpered was built at the Stabilimento Tecnico shipyard in Trieste, Italy, in 1898 for Azov Black Sea Steamship Company. She was launched and completed in the same year.

World War I and sinking 
Vpered was converted into a hospital ship when World War I broke out and operated in the Black Sea to evacuate wounded Russian soldiers from the Eastern Front.

On 8 July 1916, Vpered was torpedoed by the Imperial German Navy submarine SM U-38 in the Black Sea between Rize and Batum. She sank shortly after. She was not carrying any wounded soldiers at the time, but seven people died in her sinking. Her survivors were saved a short time later.

The Russian Empire claimed that Ottoman forces sank Vpered rather than the Germans.  The Ottoman Empire replied that both the Vpered and the Russian Hospital Ship SS Portugal ( which was torpedoed and sunk on March 17, 1916 ) were sunk by mines.

See also
List of Russian Fleet hospital ships

References

1898 ships
Passenger ships of Russia
Hospital ships in World War I
Steamships of Russia
Ships built in Trieste
Maritime incidents in 1916
World War I shipwrecks in the Black Sea
World War I ships of Russia
Hospital ships of the Soviet Union and Russia